Brady catamarans  are twin-hulled boats that are designed by Peter Brady  a well respected New Zealand  designer. Brady originally designed sailing cats, motorsailers and power cats, but for the last 20 years the firm (now called Pathfinder Powercats) has specialised in powered catamarans exclusively.

Brady catamarans are either constructed at Brady's Brisbane boatyard, or plans-built by third-party constructors for private owners. Brady catamarans tend to be built in small numbers or even as one-offs, so the firm has adopted "strip-plank" as the optimum construction method. Strip-build involves attaching strips of cedar onto formers, the strips themselves being glued edge-on with epoxy. The completed wooden monococque is then covered with fiberglass matting and epoxy resin. This method is very suitable for low-volume construction, avoiding the need to build a female mould; it is simpler and cheaper to manufacture a plywood jig that may be discarded afterwards.

Brady catamaran models
Brady catamaran models include:
 Brady 45 - sailing yacht with twin 40hp Yanmar auxiliary engines.
 Brady 52 "Passagemaker" - a motorsailer with a modest-area staysail schooner rig and twin Perkins 95hp main engines.
 Brady 57 "Pathfinder pilothouse 17.4" - a luxury 57' cruising motoryacht.  
 Brady Pathfinder M Series - a range of displaning power catamarans between 41 and 49ft.
 Brady Powercats - various models for leisure, fishing, and business use.

See also 
 List of multihulls
 Boat building

External links
 Pathfinder Powercats 
 Magazine articles

References 

Catamarans
Shipbuilding companies of Australia